Glen Collins (born 7 September 1977) is an association football player who represented New Zealand at international level.

Club career
He played as a midfielder and returned to football to play for NZFC outfit Canterbury United having switched codes to rugby for five years.

International career
He has played 3 times for the New Zealand national soccer team, the All Whites in 2002.

References

External links
 Glen Collins Interview
 Rugby-playing ex-All White switches codes again

1977 births
Living people
Association footballers from Christchurch
New Zealand association footballers
New Zealand international footballers
National Soccer League (Australia) players
2002 OFC Nations Cup players
North Carolina Fusion U23 players
Football Kingz F.C. players
Association football midfielders